Fabien Cloutier is a Canadian actor and playwright from Quebec. He is best known for his play Pour réussir un poulet, which won the Governor General's Award for French language drama at the 2015 Governor General's Awards. He was previously shortlisted for the same award at the 2012 Governor General's Awards, and won the Prix Gratien-Gélinas in 2011, for Billy (Les jours de hurlement).

His other plays include Scotstown, Cranbourne, and La guerre des tuques.

As an actor, he performs primarily on stage, although he had a notable early television role in the series Watatatow.

Works 
 Oùsqu'y é Chabot? [2005].
 Scotstown [2008]. Translated into English by David Laurin, and into German by Frank Weigand.
 Cranbourne [2011].
 Billy (Les jours de hurlement) [2011]. Translated into English by Nadine Desrochers as Billy (The Days of Howling), and into German by Frank Weigand as Billy (brüllende Tage).
 La guerre des tuques [2013].
 Pour réussir un poulet [2014]. Translated into English by Marie-Claude Plourde (How to Bake the Perfect Chicken).

References

21st-century Canadian dramatists and playwrights
Canadian male dramatists and playwrights
Canadian dramatists and playwrights in French
Writers from Quebec
Male actors from Quebec
Canadian male stage actors
Canadian male television actors
Living people
Governor General's Award-winning dramatists
People from Chaudière-Appalaches
1975 births
21st-century Canadian male writers